Leptanthicus is a genus of antlike flower beetles in the family Anthicidae. There is one described species in Leptanthicus, L. staphyliniformis.

References

Further reading

 

Anthicidae
Articles created by Qbugbot